Euphorbia stellata is a species of flowering plant in the spurge family (Euphorbiaceae) endemic to the Eastern Cape of South Africa.

The specific epithet stellata refers to the star-shaped arrangement of the stems around the caudex.

References

stellata
Endemic flora of South Africa